J&J Design is a naval architecture, design, boat and production-process engineering company, mainly for high-volume production sail and powerboat builders. It introduced the carbon-epoxy technology from the America's Cup into cruising sailboats with the Shipman line. J&J also designed and engineered the first serial production hybrid powerboats, the Greenline Hybrid range.

History 

J&J Design was founded in 1983 by brothers Japec Jakopin and Jernej Jakopin in Ljubljana, Slovenia. Japec, the elder brother learned to sail by the age of 13. After graduating from the Medical school at the University of Ljubljana in 1974 he pursued an academic career at that school's Institute of Physiology and at the University Medical Centre. During that time he spent the weekends designing and building do-it-yourself boats, and operating a sailboat charter base. In 1983 CEO of Elan, the main Slovenian sporting goods (including recreational boats) manufacturer, accepted his proposal to come up with a better sailboat model. Younger brother Jernej Jakopin, an architect with a degree from Westlawn Institute of Marine Technology, joined in and J&J Design was founded. Elan 31 sailboat was its first project.

Elan 31 was followed by Elan 33, 34, 38 and 43. In 1985, skippered by Dušan Puh, Elan 31R won the production boat prize at the Three Quarter Ton World Championship in Marstrand, Sweden.
Elan sold 940 units of the Elan 31 and 33, and between 1983 and 1987 increased its marine sales from DEM 2 M to DEM 32 M (2.6 M US$ to 42 M US$, as of 2016, inflation adjusted).
After 1987, when the new management of Elan decided to refocus on ski production, J&J Design continued designing boats for other European boatyards, mainly for Jeanneau.

Seaway 

In 1989 the two brothers founded a broader company, Seaway, expanding the design to engineering, tooling and prototyping for boat manufacturers.

By 2000 Seaway became the only independent company outside major yacht builders that could engage in the entire boat development process - from design to prototype and final moulds, for a list of clients that included Bavaria, Jeanneau, Dufour Yachts and Grand Soleil. Its revenue grew to 6.6 M Euros.

KD Group, one of the largest Slovenian private finance groups, invested 3 M Euros in the company in 2001, for a 50% share and a request for change of strategy to own boat production. This investment enabled the purchase of a robot for precise prototype and mould production, required by Seaway's customers and acquisition of new, larger premises for installation of the new tool.

In 2003 J&J Design developed, in cooperation with Jørgen Bonde from Denmark, the new-era Shipman sailing boat, Shipman 50, the first singlehanded high-performance pilothouse offshore cruiser. New carbon/epoxy prepreg technology (Carbon fiber reinforced polymer), previously only used in competition sailing such as the America's Cup, made possible the transition to lighter, faster and more efficient production cruising yachts. Shipman 50 was followed by bigger Shipman 63, Shipman 72 and Shipman 80 models.

In 2009 a hybrid powerboat with diesel, electric and solar propulsion was developed and produced, the 33 feet (10 m) long Greenline Hybrid 33.

Its main appeal besides the hybrid propulsion with zero-emission and no-noise sailing was the constant availability of 110/230 VAC power for appliances. Arguably the best-selling 10 m boat in 2010 and 2011 it sold 400 units by 2015, and was followed by larger models, GL 40 in 2011, Ocean Class 70 in 2012 and GL 48 in 2014.

Hybrid technology was also applied to the sailing boat line, to the Shipman 59 Hybrid Solar Carbon in 2014, designed together with Doug Peterson and the French naval architect Guillaume Verdier.

The world financial crisis of 2007 had a severe impact on the pleasure boat sector. The enduring credit crunch that followed crippled the production at Seaway and despite the full order book in 2015 both divisions of the company went out of business.

J&J Design Revival 

The boatbuilding part of Seaway (Greenline and Shipman ranges) was taken over by Vladimir Zinchenko (SVP Yachts) while Jakopin brothers reestablished J&J Design as an independent company with Japec Jakopin and Jernej Jakopin as the CEOs and with a team of 25 designers and engineers.

The company continued to work for major volume boatbuilders in the power and sailing area, including the Greenline builder SVP Yachts, by providing design as well as boat engineering and production process engineering for vessels from 20 to 80 feet.

Awarded Designs 

J&J designs have won over 110 Boat of the Year, Design or Environmental awards. European Yacht of the Year (awarded annually since 2001) and European Powerboat of the Year (since 2005) prize winning designs are listed below.

Other designs
ETAP 39s
Sun Dance 36
Sun Odyssey 36
Sun Way 21

References

External References 
 J&J Design website 
 Greenline Hybrid boat site
 Shipman sailing yacht site 

J&J Design